Héctor Cassina (born 6 October 1943) is a former Argentine cyclist. He competed in the individual road race at the 1968 Summer Olympics.

References

External links
 

1943 births
Living people
Argentine male cyclists
Olympic cyclists of Argentina
Cyclists at the 1968 Summer Olympics
People from Rafaela
Sportspeople from Santa Fe Province